Glencannon Press is a California-based publishing company that specializes in the publication of books with maritime themes.

The company publishes both fiction and non-fiction books. Its clients include the Friends of the San Francisco Maritime Museum Library, a division of the National Park Service.

References

External links
Glencannon Press homepage.

Book publishing companies based in the San Francisco Bay Area
Companies based in Contra Costa County, California